John Marshall's Leeds Manor Rural  Historic District is a national historic district located near Markham, in Fauquier County, northeastern Virginia.

Description

The historic district encompasses 395 contributing buildings, 45 contributing sites, and 24 contributing structures.  The district is characterized as a cohesive locality that is characterized by large expanses of open agricultural land, historic roadways, and rolling foothill terrain.

The architectural resources located within the district are a diverse collection of types and styles dating from the mid-18th century through the mid-20th century.

It was listed on the National Register of Historic Places in 2007.

References

Historic districts in Fauquier County, Virginia
National Register of Historic Places in Fauquier County, Virginia
Historic districts on the National Register of Historic Places in Virginia